Stranger in My land is a 2014 Indian English/Hindi documentary-style short film written and directed by Duyu Tabyo, and produced and co-written by Padi Genda. The film was produced and released under the banner of CoreConxept Entertainment in association with Padi Genda Pictures.

Based upon the racial discrimination faced by people of Northeast India, the film attempts to portray the ignorance of the mainland Indians towards those from North-east India, and was released August 2014.

Plot
The film opens with James (Kargo Basar) sitting at his desk and writing to Prime Minister of India Manmohan Singh regarding racially motivated attacks in Australia upon citizens of Northeast India. The man condemns racism and seeks ministerial attention toward the issues of similar discrimination within mainland India toward the people of Arunachal Pradesh. As the man's narration continues, the film shows recreations of the events of which he is concerned.

Cast

 Kargo Basar as James
 Dipit Agarwal as Anil's son Dipit
 Shekhar Nair as Anil
 Aishna Sharma as Anil's wife
 Somet Chang as Girl in the kitchen
 Meka Yukar as College girl returning Home
 Boby Techi as Mapuii, the job applicant from Mizoram)
 Saurabh as Boss interviewing Mapuii
 Pramod as Minicab's driver
 Talimoa Pongener as Victim of stabbing
 Amaan Mehar as Attacker
 Yarenthung Odyüo as Man running past the stabbing
 Lumposen as Young boy dressed as Subhash Chandra Bose

Production
Based upon real events in the life of Duyu Tabyo when he was victim of and heard of other incidents of discrimination suffered by people of Northeast India inflicted upon them in areas of mainland Indians, Tabyo set out beginning during December 2013, to create his film to address and document the racism. The film was shot in Delhi. Costume designed by Lucy Nelia Kolakhe and casting by Amaan Khan Meher.

See also

 Boby Techi
 Racism

References

External links
 as archived January 9, 2015

2010s Hindi-language films
Indian short films
2014 films
Indian drama films
Indian documentary films
Films shot in Delhi
2010s English-language films
2014 multilingual films
Indian multilingual films